Mana Contemporary is a cultural center in  Jersey City, New Jersey, United States with affiliated centers in Chicago and Miami.

History and Founder 
Opened in May 2011, the center was founded by moving company mogul Moishe Mana. Shai Baitel and the artist Yigal Ozeri are among the co-founders.

The one million square foot facility in Jersey city is situated in a 1920s-era brick former manufacturing building in the city's Marion Section near Marion Junction that is also an extension of the fine arts transportation department of Moishe's Moving Systems.

In 2021 Mana Contemporary's Executive Director Eugene Lemay was placed on administrative leave due to his indictment of tax fraud and conspiracy for evading to pay nearly $8 million to the IRS while helping to run Moishe's Moving Systems.

Art Center 
The center provides services, spaces, and programming for artists, collectors, curators, performers, students and community.

It includes artist studios, exhibition spaces, and storage and is home to the Middle East Center for the Arts  (MECA), the archives of the International Center of Photography and the Magnum Foundation, the dance companies of Karole Armitage and Shen Wei, and foundations established by Eileen S Kaminsky (ESKFF) and Carole Feuerman. The artist Amy Sherald has her studio in Mana (NJ).

Richard Meier Model Museum
The building is also home to the Richard Meier Model Museum, an exhibition of architectural projects, sculptures and collages by Richard Meier.

Mana Decentralized 
Mana Decentralized is an online and physical platform selling artworks directly to collectors, launched in April 2019.

See also

India Square
Hudson County exhibition spaces
Jersey City Museum
Museum of Russian Art
111 First Street
The Powerhouse

References

External links 
 Mana Contemporary
 Mana Contemporary Chicago
 Mana Wynwood
MECA
Armitage Gone! Dance!
Shen Weid Dance Arts
Eileen S Kaminsky Family Foundation
Richard Meier Model Museum

Culture of Jersey City, New Jersey
Art museums and galleries in New Jersey
Museums in Hudson County, New Jersey
Buildings and structures in Jersey City, New Jersey
Art museums established in 2011
2011 establishments in New Jersey
Tourist attractions in Jersey City, New Jersey